Marilyn Lenore Howard (April 18, 1939July 13, 2020) was an American politician from Idaho who served as the 23rd Idaho Superintendent of Public Instruction from 1999 to 2007. She is the most recent member of the Democratic Party to have held statewide office in Idaho.

Early life
Marilyn Lenore Howard was born on April 18, 1939, in Mackay, Idaho. In 1960, Howard graduated with a bachelor's degree in education from the University of Idaho and later with a master's degree in 1966. In 1986, she graduated with a doctorate in education from Brigham Young University. She completed postgraduate work at Idaho State University.

Career

Education
In 1960, Howard became a history and language arts teacher in Lewiston, Idaho. In 1988, she became the principal of the West Park Elementary School in Moscow, Idaho. In 1992, she became the supervisor of the Moscow school district's developmental preschool.

Superintendent of Public Instruction
In 1997, Howard announced that she would seek the Democratic nomination for Idaho Superintendent of Public Instruction and defeated Wally Hedrick in the Democratic primary. In the general election she defeated incumbent Republican Superintendent Anne C. Fox. On January 29, 2002, she announced that she would seek reelection and won in the general election after defeating Republican nominee Tom Luna.

In 2000, Howard was listed as the 26th most influential Idahoan. In 2002, she was lsited as the 12th most influential Idahoan. During her tenure she and Governor Dirk Kempthorne attempted to create a position in the state Department of Education to oversee the education of Native American students, but the Idaho Legislature voted against it. However, the position would be later created by Tom Luna in 2007. In December 2006, she was criticized for distributing $120,098 in merit bonuses to 135 of her employees.

On October 25, 2005, Howard announced that she would not seek reelection. When she left office in 2007 she was the last member of the Democratic Party to hold statewide office in Idaho.

Later life
In 2006, Howard underwent surgery for breast cancer. On July 13, 2020, Howard died in Eagle, Idaho, at age 81.

Electoral history

References

1939 births
2020 deaths
20th-century American politicians
21st-century American politicians
Brigham Young University alumni
Idaho Democrats
Idaho State University alumni
People from Custer County, Idaho
Superintendents of Public Instruction of Idaho
University of Idaho alumni
Women in Idaho politics
21st-century American women politicians